= Almary Green =

Small lawn and site of the church of St Ethelbert

Coordinates: 52.6304°N 1.3001°E

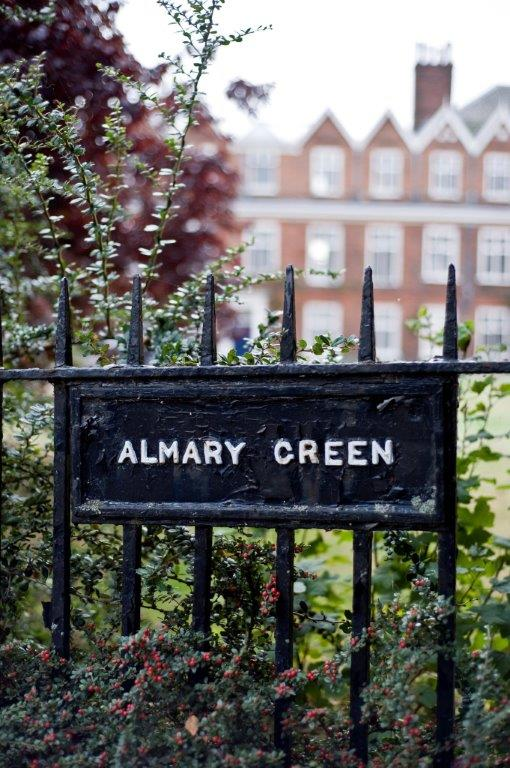
Almary Green, Norwich - Cathedral Close

Almary Green is a small lawn in the Cathedral Close in Norwich, Norfolk, England. It is thought to be the site of the probably pre-Conquest church of St Ethelbert, which was burnt to the ground in the 1272 riots along with the bell tower and the Ethelbert Gate, with the latter being rebuilt by the Town on order of King John.

Very little is known about St Ethelbert's church, however it is known to pre-date Norwich Cathedral and to have stood when the French Prince Louis plundered Norwich in 1217 after the barons of Norwich invited Prince Louis to seize the throne from King John in 1215.

The Green itself is located just in front of the 1-4 The Close properties in the cathedral close, which, at 44-acres is one of the biggest in the country. The Green is located south-west of Ethelbert Gate and is surrounded by stately 18th-century properties. To the west of the Green (probably immediately west) is the probable location of Roger Bigod's palatium at the south end of Tombland, perhaps representing the earlier palace of the Saxon earls.

The Green is thought to have been established during the mid-19th century: it is not shown on Millard and Manning's map of 1830, but was essentially as it is today (including the gates and railings at the north end) by the time of the Ordnance Survey map of 1882. A resistivity survey in the 1970s identified high resistance anomalies that may represent a building, which possibly could be the church of St Ethelbert. The long undisturbed open area of Almary Green suggests a high potential for early (Late Saxon or monastic period) subsurface archaeology.
